Ronald Tinkler (born 4 May 1934) is a South African water polo player. He competed in the men's tournament at the 1960 Summer Olympics.

References

1934 births
Living people
South African male water polo players
Olympic water polo players of South Africa
Water polo players at the 1960 Summer Olympics
Sportspeople from Johannesburg